Sven Martin Boquist (born 2 February 1977) is a Swedish handball coach, previously handball player. Currently he is assistant coach for VästeråsIrsta HF, and the Norwegian men’s national team.

Achievements 
EHF Cup
Winner: 2004
Runner-up: 2008
EHF Cup Winners' Cup
Runner-up: 2003
 Handball-Bundesliga
Winner: 2005
 Swedish League
Winner: 2000, 2001, 2003
 Danish League
Winner: 2008
 Danish Cup
Winner: 2009

Individual awards
 Handball player of the year in Sweden: 2002, 2003

References

External links
 sports-reference.com
 EHF

1977 births
Living people
Handball players from Gothenburg
Swedish male handball players
Olympic handball players of Sweden
Handball players at the 2000 Summer Olympics
Medalists at the 2000 Summer Olympics
Olympic silver medalists for Sweden
Swedish expatriate sportspeople in Denmark
Swedish expatriate sportspeople in Germany
Olympic medalists in handball
Redbergslids IK players
THW Kiel players